Academic Society of Iranians in Japan, abbreviated as ASIJ, is a non-governmental and non-profit organization of Iranian students and researchers in Japan. According to the articles, apart from internal aims, the organization aims at promoting relations and exchange between the academics of Iran and those of other countries, particularly Japan.

Major Activities 
ASIJ annually holds an international conference in Tokyo with presentations in Persian, English and Japanese languages.  In the multi-disciplinary conference, in addition to Iranian and Japanese education authorities as invited guests, members from various Japanese university present and discuss their latest scientific achievements.

ASIJ in the Media 
Aftab News Agency, February 25, 2006: The First Annual Conference of ASIJ was held. (inPersian:اولین نشست جامعه علمی ایرانیان در ژاپن برگزار شد).

IRNA (Islamic Republic News Agency), February 24, 2007: The Second Annual Conference of ASIJ was held. (inPersian: دومين سمينار سالانه جامعه علمي ايرانيان در ژاپن برگزار شد).

NHK World Radio Japan, Persian, March 4, 2007, 12:41:10-12:50:00JST: An introduction to the Academic Society of Iranians in Japan by the radio program "Barg-e-sabz" (inPersian:معرفی جامعه علمی ايرانيان در ژاپن  )

References 

Student societies in Japan
Ethnic student organizations
Iran–Japan relations
Student organizations established in 2004